Dogani may refer to:

 Đogani, Serbian pop-folk duo
 Dogani, Jajce, a village in Bosnia and Herzegovina
 The Crucible (novel), 2009 South Korean novel by Gong Ji-young 
 Silenced (film), 2011 film based on Gong's novel